The Hidden Matching Problem is a computation complexity problem that can be solved using quantum protocols: Let  be a positive even integer. In the Hidden Matching Problem, Alice is given  and Bob is given ( denotes the family of all possible perfect matchings on  nodes).

It has been used to find quantum communication problems that demonstrate super-polynomial advantage of over classical ones.

Background 
Communication complexity  is  a  model  of  computation  first  introduced  by  Yao in 1979. Two parties (normally called Alice and Bob) each hold a piece of data and want to solve some  computational  task  that  jointly  depends  on  their  data. Alice knows only information  and Bob knows only information , and they want to solve some function .

There are two key communication models that can be considered:

 One-way communication is the model where Alice sends a single message to Bob who has to give an answer, based on the content of the message and his part of input.
 Interactive (two-way) communication is the model where the players can interactively exchange messages till Bob decides to give an answer, based on the communication transcript and his part of input.

Communication tasks can be either functional, meaning that there is exactly one correct answer corresponding to every possible input, or relational, when multiple correct answers are allowed.

History 
The Hidden Matching Problem was first defined in 2004 by Bar-Yossef, Jayram and Kerenidis. Through its definition, they were able to provide the first exponential separation between quantum and bounded-error randomized one-way communication complexity. The Hidden Matching Problem is a relational problem.

In the same paper, the authors proposed a Boolean version of the problem, the Boolean Hidden Matching problem,  and conjectured that the same quantum-classical gap holds for it as well. This was later proven to be true by Gavinsky et al.

In 2008, Gavinsky further improved on Bar-Yossef et al.’s result by showing an exponential separation between one-way quantum communication and two-way  classical communication.

Applications 
The Hidden Matching Problem was used as the basis of Gavinsky's 2012 Quantum Coin Scheme. Bob has been given a coin as payment for some goods or services. This coin consists of a quantum register containing multiple qubits. Bob wishes to verify that the coin is legitimate.

In a classical scenario, a digital coin is made up of a unique string of classical bits, a coin holder sends this string to the bank and the bank compares it to a static database of valid strings. If the string exists in the database then the bank confirms that the coin is valid. However, this leaves the potential for an adversary to masquerade as the bank and steal a coin holder's coin under the pretence of verifying it.

Using the Hidden matching problem, the coin holder can send the relevant information to the bank and the bank can verify that the coin is legitimate but an adversary masquerading as a bank will not learn enough to be able to reproduce the coin.

In the protocol Bob will provide  values  to the bank. These values  are attained by Bob measuring certain quantum registers in his coin. If , then the bank can verify that Bob does in fact hold a valid coin corresponding to the classical values .

 refers to the four bit version of the Hidden Matching Problem.

References 

Quantum cryptography